Facundo Mura (born 23 March 1999) is an Argentine professional footballer who plays as a right-back for Racing Club.

Club career
Mura started his career with Estudiantes, signing in 2013 following stints with Argentinos del Norte and Deportivo Roca. He was promoted to the senior set-up in March 2019 under caretaker manager Pablo Quatrocchi, who selected him to start a La Plata derby fixture in the Primera División against Gimnasia y Esgrima on 10 March; the defender played sixty-nine minutes, prior to being substituted off for Juan Ignacio Díaz. On 13 February 2021, Mura joined Colon on a loan until the end of the year with a purchase option.

On 13 January 2022, Mura was sold to Racing Club, with the player signing a deal until the end of 2025.

International career
In January 2019, Mura represented Argentina at the South American U-20 Championship in Chile. He won caps against Paraguay, Ecuador, Colombia and Brazil as his nation finished as runners-up. In the previous year, Mura was called up for the L'Alcúdia International Tournament; featuring five times as they won the trophy. He also had experience of training with the seniors, as well as being on the pre-tournament squad ahead of the 2018 South American Games. Mura was selected for the 2019 FIFA U-20 World Cup by Fernando Batista. In the succeeding September, Mura made Batista's U23 squad for a friendly with Bolivia.

Personal life
Mura's brother, Joaquín, is a fellow footballer; who also began his career in the academy of Estudiantes.

Career statistics
.

Honours
Argentina U23
Pre-Olympic Tournament: 2020

References

External links

1999 births
Living people
People from General Roca
Argentine people of Italian descent
Argentine footballers
Argentina youth international footballers
Argentina under-20 international footballers
Association football defenders
Argentine Primera División players
Estudiantes de La Plata footballers
Club Atlético Colón footballers
Racing Club de Avellaneda footballers